Tolna is an unincorporated community in York County, Pennsylvania, United States. Tolna is located near Pennsylvania Route 851.

References

Unincorporated communities in York County, Pennsylvania
Unincorporated communities in Pennsylvania